George Bibb Crittenden (March 20, 1812 – November 27, 1880) was a career United States Army officer who served in the Black Hawk War, the Army of the Republic of Texas, and the Mexican–American War, and later resigned his commission to serve as a general in the Confederate States Army in the American Civil War.

Early life
George B. Crittenden was born in Russellville, Kentucky. His father was U.S. politician John J. Crittenden and his brothers were Thomas Leonidas Crittenden and Eugene W. Crittenden. His cousin was Thomas Turpin Crittenden who became a general for the Union Army.

West Point education and early military experiences
George B. Crittenden graduated from the United States Military Academy in 1832 and was commissioned a second lieutenant in the 4th U.S. Infantry. He fought in the Black Hawk War of 1832 and resigned his commission the following year. He attended Transylvania University and became a lawyer. He moved to the Republic of Texas in 1842 and joined the Army of the Republic of Texas. During the Mier Expedition of 1843, he was captured by the Mexican army and exchanged. He rejoined the U.S. Army in 1846 and fought with the Regiment of Mounted Rifles in the Mexican–American War. He was given a brevet promotion to major for gallantry at Contreras and Churubusco in 1847 and a permanent promotion to major in the regular army in 1848. However, on August 19, 1848, he was discharged from the Army, but reinstated in March 1849. He eventually reached the permanent rank of lieutenant colonel in 1856.

American Civil War
Just before the start of the Civil War, Crittenden accepted a commission as colonel, in the Confederate States Army infantry on March 16, 1861, although he would not resign his U.S. Army commission until June 10. He was promoted to brigadier general on August 15, 1861 and served briefly as a brigade commander in the Confederate Army of the Potomac in Virginia. He was promoted to major general on November 9, 1861 and commanded the District of East Tennessee. On January 19, 1862, he and Confederate Brig. Gen. Felix Zollicoffer were defeated by Union Brigadier General George H. Thomas at the Battle of Mill Springs, the first important Confederate defeat in the war, breaking the Southern hold on eastern Kentucky.

He briefly commanded the 2nd Division of the Army of Central Kentucky in 1862 but was relieved on March 31. He was arrested the next day on charges of drunkenness by the order of Maj. Gen. William J. Hardee and restored on April 18. General Braxton Bragg ordered a court of inquiry in July and Crittenden resigned as a general officer, reverting to colonel in October 1862.

Postbellum career
He served as the state librarian of Kentucky from 1867 to 1871. He died in Danville, Kentucky, and is buried in the State Cemetery, Frankfort, Kentucky.

See also
 List of American Civil War generals (Confederate)

Notes

References
 Eicher, John H., and David J. Eicher. Civil War High Commands. Stanford, CA: Stanford University Press, 2001. .
 Eubank, Damon R. In the Shadow of the Patriarch: The John J. Crittenden Family in War and Peace. Macon, Georgia:  Mercer University Press, 2009, .
 Sifakis, Stewart. Who Was Who in the Civil War. New York: Facts On File, 1988. .
 Warner, Ezra J. Generals in Gray: Lives of the Confederate Commanders. Baton Rouge: Louisiana State University Press, 1959. .

External links
 

1812 births
1880 deaths
People from Russellville, Kentucky
Crittenden family
Confederate States Army major generals
United States Army colonels
Army of the Republic of Texas officers
American people of the Black Hawk War
American military personnel of the Mexican–American War
United States Military Academy alumni
People of Kentucky in the American Civil War
Transylvania University alumni
People from Danville, Kentucky
Kentucky lawyers
Burials at Frankfort Cemetery